Qadaman (also Romanized as Qadamān; also known as Chāh-e Qadamān and Chāh Qadamān) is a village in Asir Rural District, Asir District, Mohr County, Fars Province, Iran. At the 2006 census, its population was 232, in 53 families.

References 

Populated places in Mohr County